Pickering Crater is a crater in the Phaethontis quadrangle on Mars, located at 33.1° south latitude and 132.5° west longitude.

Lava flow fronts are visible within the crater, and the source of the lava is Arsia Mons.  The lava has flowed around the central peak of the crater.

The crater was named after several people: Edward Charles Pickering,  American astronomer (1846–1919); his brother William Henry Pickering, American astronomer (1858–1938); and Sir William Hayward Pickering (unrelated), New Zealand-American engineer (1910–2004).

See also 
 Asteroid 784 Pickeringia
 List of craters on Mars

References 

Phaethontis quadrangle
Impact craters on Mars